Bayt Shanna was a Palestinian Arab village in the Ramle Subdistrict of Mandatory Palestine. It was depopulated during the 1948 Arab–Israeli War on July 15, 1948, during the second stage of Operation Dani. It was located 11.5 km southeast of Ramla.

History
Ceramics from the Byzantine era have been found here.

Ottoman era
Bayt Shanna  was incorporated into the Ottoman Empire in 1517 with all of Palestine, and in 1596 it appeared in the  tax registers under the name of  Bayt Sanna, as being in the  nahiya ("subdistrict") of Ramla, which was under the administration of the liwa ("district") of Gaza. It had a population of 4 household; an estimated 22 persons,  who were all Muslims. They paid a fixed tax-rate of 25 % on agricultural products, including wheat, barley, summer crops,  vineyards, fruit trees,  goats and beehives, in addition to occasional revenues; a total of 1,000 Akçe. All of the revenue went to a Waqf.

In 1838, it was noted as Beit Shinna,  a place "in ruins or deserted,"  in the Ibn Humar area in the  District of Er-Ramleh.

In 1883, the PEF's Survey of Western Palestine noted at Beit Shenna: "Traces of ruins and squared stones."

British Mandate era
In the 1922 census of Palestine, conducted by the British Mandate authorities, Bait Shanna  had a population of 8  Muslims,  increasing in the 1931 census, when it was counted together with Salbit, to 406, still all Muslims, in a total of 71 houses.

In the 1945 statistics, the village had a population of 210 Muslims with 3,617 dunams of land.  Of this, 44 dunams were used for plantations and irrigable land, 865 for cereals, while 2,708 dunams were non-cultivable areas.

1948, and aftermath
Bayt  Shanna became depopulated after a military assault on July 15–16, 1948.

As of 1992, there were no Israeli settlement on village land. Sha'alvim, on the land of the depopulated Palestinian village of Salbit is the closest.

In 1992, the village  site was described: "The stone rubble of the former houses covers the village site. Large mulberry, olive, and almond trees grow amid the rubble, most of which is covered by wild vegetation. The whole site is fenced in and appears to be used as a grazing area. On the hillside east of the village, a room made of masonry still stands. Fruit trees grow around it."

References

Bibliography

External links
Welcome To Bayt Shanna
Bayt Shanna, Zochrot
Survey of Western Palestine, Map 17:    IAA, Wikimedia commons 

Arab villages depopulated during the 1948 Arab–Israeli War
District of Ramla